Sweden competed at the 1984 Summer Paralympics in Stoke Mandeville, Great Britain and New York City, United States. 97 competitors from Sweden won 160 medals including 83 gold, 43 silver and 34 bronze and finished 4th in the medal table.

See also 
 Sweden at the Paralympics
 Sweden at the 1984 Summer Olympics

References 

1984
1984 in Swedish sport
Nations at the 1984 Summer Paralympics